"Wake Up" is a song written by Colin Moulding of the English rock band XTC, released as the opening track on their 1984 album The Big Express. It was the third and last single issued from the album, following "All You Pretty Girls" and "This World Over", and peaked at number 92 on the UK Singles Chart.

Overview
"Wake Up" opens the album with guitars and piano followed by a chorus lyric that proclaims "who cares, you might be dead". Colin Moulding explained:

To write the song, Moulding started with a three-note piano figure, which he then overdubbed with two guitar riffs. He said: "The track didn't really happen until [producer] David Lord got hold of it. A local girl came in and sang the 'choir', tracked up a load of times." Guitarist Andy Partridge said of Lord's embellishments: "He blew it up like one of those hot air balloons in the shape of a palace." Guitarist Dave Gregory commented: "We love confusing intros: records that start with a naked riff with no drum beat. And then when the drums come in, or the band comes in, it throws you completely."

The song employs only a few different chords, a point that Gregory was dissatisfied with. He opined: "The coolest part of the song was the chopping guitars but Colin should have written a better song around that hook. It just went on forever doing nothing. It sounds a good way to start an album but it's not my idea of a musical experience."

Personnel
XTC
 Dave Gregory
 Colin Moulding
 Andy Partridge

Charts

References

External links
 

Songs written by Colin Moulding
Virgin Records singles
1984 singles
1984 songs
XTC songs